Anson Dyer, born Ernest J. Anson Dyer (Brighton, 18 July 1876 – Cheltenham, 22 February 1962), was an English director, screenwriter, animator, and actor. His company Stratford Abbey Films, based in Stroud, was the only Technicolor production unit and three-colour camera in the whole Western Europe in the 1940s.

Filmography 
The following filmography, based on the Internet Movie Database is incomplete.

Director

Peter's Picture Poems (1917)
Old King Koal (1917)
Three Little Pigs (1918)
Oh'phelia or Oh'phelia a Cartoon Burlesque (1919)
Romeo and Juliet (1919)
The Merchant of Venice (1919)
'Amlet (1919)
Othello (1920)
Dollars in Surrey, co-directed by George Dewhurst (1921)
Little Red Riding Hood (1922)
A Day Out In Liverpool (1929)
The Story of the Port of London (1932)
Drummed Out
Sam and His Musket
Beat the Retreat
Carmen (1936)
Sam's Medal
Halt, Who Goes There?
The Lion and Albert
Three Ha'pence a Foot
Gunner Sam
As Old as the Hills
Fowl Play (1950)

Writer

Peter's Picture Poems, directed by Anson Dyer (1917)
Old King Koal, directed by Anson Dyer (1917)
Oh'phelia or Oh'phelia a Cartoon Burlesque, directed by Anson Dyer (1919)
Romeo and Juliet, directed by Anson Dyer (1919)
The Merchant of Venice, directed by Anson Dyer (1919)
'Amlet, directed by Anson Dyer (1919)
Othello, directed by Anson Dyer (1920)
The Story of the Port of London, directed by Anson Dyer (1932)
Flood Tide, directed by John Baxter (1934)
Carmen, directed by Anson Dyer (1936)
The Vicar of Bray, directed by Henry Edwards (1937)
The Second Mate, directed by John Baxter (1950)

Animator

The Story of the Port of London, directed by Anson Dyer (1932)
Peter's Picture Poems, directed by Anson Dyer (1917)
Old King Koal, directed by Anson Dyer (1917)
Oh'phelia or Oh'phelia a Cartoon Burlesque, directed by Anson Dyer (1919)
Romeo and Juliet, directed by Anson Dyer (1919)
The Merchant of Venice, directed by Anson Dyer (1919)
'Amlet, directed by Anson Dyer (1919)
Othello, directed by Anson Dyer (1920)

Animation Shorts (Gaumont-British News)
The British Lion Awakes, directed by Anson Dyer (1939) 
Hitler On His Front Line, directed by Anson Dyer (1939)
Hitler's Peace Pudding, directed by Anson Dyer (1939)
Hitler Dances To Stalin's Tune, directed by Anson Dyer (1939)
Run, Adolf, Run, directed by Anson Dyer (1940)

Director of photography
Peter's Picture Poems, directed by Anson Dyer (1917)

Actor
Old King Koal, directed by Anson Dyer (1917)

References

External links  
 
 
 

1876 births
1962 deaths
British animated film directors
British animated film producers
British animators
British film directors
British film producers